Dourdan is a commune in the Essonne department in Île-de-France. It is the capital of the historical region of Hurepoix. 

It is located in the metropolitan area of Paris.

Geography 
Dourdan is located on the river Orge in the western Essonne. The town is surrounded by the Dourdan forest (Forêt de Dourdan).

Climate

Dourdan has a oceanic climate (Köppen climate classification Cfb).

History 
The origin of the name comes credibly from "Dour" derived of the Celtic root "Dor" which means "water" or "river", the same origin as for the English city of Dover. The radical "dan" could have meant "hill". Dourdan (Dordincum) developed during the Gallo-Roman period as an important center of production of ceramics. In the Middle Ages, it became the residence of Hugh the Great, father of Hugh Capet; he died there in 956.

Dourdan became a royal city in 987, when Hugh Capet was crowned king.

In 1220, King Philip II Augustus of France built a new castle; its most famous owners were:  Blanche de Castille, Louis d'Évreux, Jean, duc de Berry, François de Lorraine, duc de Guise, Maximilien de Béthune, duc de Sully, Anne of Austria and the House of Orléans.

General Auguste Jubé de La Perelle (1765–1824) died in Dourdan.

Population
Inhabitants of Dourdan are known as Dourdannais.

Transportation 
Two train and RER stations are located in Dourdan: Dourdan and Dourdan-la-Forêt, terminus of one of the branches of the RER C line.

The Dourdan SNCF station is on the line going from Paris Gare d'Austerlitz to Vendôme and Châteaudun.

Both stations allow passengers to go to Paris and Versailles, with trains leaving every 30 minutes during the day and every 15 minutes during rush hour.

An express bus line connects Dourdan to Massy and Orsay using A10 highway every 5 minutes during rush hour and every hour during the day.

Main sights

Saint-Germain-d'Auxerre Church 
Construction of the church began in 1150 and was completed by the end of the 12th century. In 1428, during the Hundred Years' War, its upper part was badly damaged by the troops of the Earl of Salisbury, and it was not restored before the end of the 15th century. It was again damaged by the Huguenots during the Wars of Religion (1562–1598). In 1641, the asymmetric spires were constructed and, in 1689, the chapel dedicated to the Virgin Mary (chapelle de la Vierge) was built, increasing the length of the building from 36 to 50 metres. During the French Revolution of 1789, the church was again damaged. It was turned into a Temple of Reason (Temple de la Raison victorieuse), and also a prison until 1795.

Castle 

Built at the request of Philip II Augustus at the beginning of the 13th century in the place of a wooden fortress, it is characteristic of the military architecture of this period. The castle is built on a square pattern, with towers at three of the corners and an isolated donjon at the fourth. The walls are punctuated by towers in the middle of each side, and two, on the east side, flank the gate. A deep stone-lined dry moat follows the outline of the castle. The donjon, the major defensive component of the castle, measures approximately 30 metres in height and 13.6 metres in diameter. It is the typical of the donjons being built by Philip Augustus at this time (e.g. Rouen), and by French nobility through the 13th century.

The conception of the geometric pattern and isolated donjon was similar to that of the castle of the Louvre. A near identical castle is found at Seringes-et-Nesles, Aisne.

The castle became the property of Jean de Berry in 1385. There was a siege during the French Wars of Religion, stables were built in this period. Some figures who spent some time there include Jeanne II, Countess of Burgundy, and La Hire, friend of Joan of Arc.

The donjon was still a royal prison during the 17th century. There is a museum of local history.

The market hall 
It was built in 1836 and is located in the downtown. It replaced the former hall from the thirteenth century. There is a floor to remind the former hall. The architect was Lucien-Tirte van Clemputte.

Around Dourdan

The Royal forest of Dourdan 
This is an old Royal forest where the kings of France used to hunt, covering a surface of 17 square kilometres. The forest is divided in 2 by the Orge river. The northern part is called forest of Saint-Arnoult while the southern part is the Ouÿe Forest (the name comes from a nearby abbey).

Education 
Primary schools in Dourdan:
 École maternelle Les Alliés
 École maternelle Jean-François Regnard
 École élémentaire Georges Leplâtre
 École élémentaire Jean-François Regnard
 École élementaire Charles Péguy

There is a high school, Lycée Alfred Kastler.

Twin towns 
Dourdan has five twin towns:
 Bad Wiessee, Germany, since 1963
 Tourougoumbé, Mali, since 1988
 Lac-Megantic, Quebec, Canada, since 1989
 Great Dunmow, United Kingdom, since 1991
 Montserrat, Spain, since 2013

See also 
Communes of the Essonne department

References

External links 

 Dourdan city council website 
Mayors of Essonne Association 
 Pictures and History 

Land use (IAURIF) 

Communes of Essonne